Fred D. Lasswell (July 25, 1916 – March 4, 2001) was an American cartoonist best known for his decades of work on the comic strip Barney Google and Snuffy Smith.

Life and career
Though born in Kennett, Missouri, Lasswell spent most of his childhood in Gainesville, Florida, where his family moved in 1918. In Florida, Lasswell lived on a rural property with no electricity or water, an experience that is generally credited with inspiring Lasswell's portrayal of the rural setting of Barney Google and Snuffy Smith.

Lasswell began cartooning during his childhood; he was in third grade when his first comic strip, "Baseball Hits", was published in the school newspaper, "The Seminole Searchlight." He later began his professional career by working for Tampa Daily Times. In 1933, Lasswell drew a poster advertising the Tampa Chamber of Commerce Jamboree, which attracted the attention of Barney Google creator Billy DeBeck. Impressed with the poster, DeBeck hired Lasswell to assist him as a letterer. Only seventeen years old at the time, Lasswell dropped out of high school to take the job.

During this period, DeBeck wanted to expand the appeal of his comic strip by adding a hillbilly character to the cast. After he and Lasswell conducted a tour of the rural southern United States to research the culture of the region, the two cartoonists introduced the character Snuffy Smith to the strip in November 1934. Snuffy was immediately popular, leading to a surge in demand for the comic strip. Throughout the 1930s, DeBeck continued to mentor Lasswell, sending him to work with preeminent illustrators of the era and to study at the Art Students League of New York. After DeBeck's death in 1942, Lasswell subsequently took over as the lead cartoonist of Barney Google and Snuffy Smith.

Over the course of his career, Lasswell drew Barney Google and Snuffy Smith for 59 years, one of the longest careers in the field. He worked alongside several assistants during his career; these included Fred Rhoads, Ray Osrin, Tom Moore, Bob Weber, and Lasswell's eventual successor John R. Rose. Lasswell's longest-serving assistant was Bob Donovan, whose tenure on the strip lasted from 1957 to 1987.

World War II
During World War II, Lasswell served as a flight radio operator for Pan American Airways in North Africa. Later in the war, he joined the Marine Corps, where he created posters and illustrated military manuals. Lasswell worked on all editions of Leatherneck Magazine, for which he created cover art, humorously illustrated stories, and the wartime comic strip Sgt. Hashmark.

Inventions and educational materials
Lasswell was a prolific inventor and early adopter of certain new technologies. His inventions included a Braille comic strip, as well as a mechanical citrus fruit harvester that he patented in 1962. In the 1990s, Lasswell became one of the first cartoonists to embrace computers in the production of his comic strip: he began lettering his comic digitally and submitting strips to King Features Syndicate by email. He also created a digital archive of his work, which was designed to provide reference material for future art teachers and students.

Beginning in the late 1970s, Lasswell ventured into the educational field, where he designed several educational games and books. His work was used to teach about the alphabet, fruits and vegetables, and environmental awareness. One of Lasswell's educational products, the "Uncle Fred's Draw and Color" series of videos, received the following praise from U.S. Secretary of Education Shirley Hufstedler: "Fred Lasswell has created a unique and whimsical way to bring fun and focus into our K-6 classrooms... The simplicity, low cost and genuine effectiveness of his teachers' manuals and methods, (for students at all levels of language proficiency) are a breath of fresh air for our children and their teachers." One video in the series, "Draw and Color Far-Out Pets", also received a Parents Choice Award in 1987.

Views on cartooning

In 1996, Lasswell reflected on the increase of social commentary into comic strips:

Personal life
Lasswell married Shirley Slesinger in 1964, and had three sons and a daughter. He died of heart failure in 2001. Upon Lasswell's death, production of Barney Google and Snuffy Smith was taken over by his assistant John R. Rose.

Lasswell was a member of the American Society of Agricultural Engineers.

Legacy and honors
Fred Lasswell received several honors from the National Cartoonists Society; in 1963, he was awarded both the Reuben Award for Outstanding Cartoonist of the Year and the National Cartoonists Society Award for the Best Humor Strip. Lasswell also received the Elzie Segar Award twice, in 1984 and 1994, making him (alongside Mort Walker) one of the only two cartoonists to receive the award twice. In 2000, the University of South Florida awarded Lasswell an honorary Doctor of Humane Letters degree. Lasswell was also awarded by the Banshees Society, a New York-based association of media professionals, who gave him the Silver Lady Award in 1962.

Lucy Shelton Caswell, Professor and Curator of the Cartoon Research Library at Ohio State University, has described Lasswell as "one of the few cartoonists to inherit a successfully syndicated comic strip and transform it into his own creation". Cartoonist R.C. Harvey memorializes Lasswell as follows:

References

External links
Uncle Fred
Lambiek Comiclopedia
NCS Awards

American comics artists
20th-century American inventors
United States Marine Corps personnel of World War II
1916 births
2001 deaths
Artists from Tampa, Florida
Reuben Award winners
United States Marines